These are the Billboard magazine Hot 100 number one hits of 1966.

That year, 16 acts achieved their first number one song, such as Simon & Garfunkel, Lou Christie, Nancy Sinatra, SSgt. Barry Sadler, The Young Rascals, The Mamas & the Papas, Percy Sledge, Tommy James & the Shondells, The Troggs, The Lovin' Spoonful, Donovan, The Association, ? and the Mysterians, The Monkees, Johnny Rivers, and The New Vaudeville Band. Frank Sinatra, having already hit number one prior to the creation of the Hot 100, earns his first one on the chart. The Beatles, The Supremes, and The Monkees are the only acts to hit number one with more than one song, with each of them having two.

Chart history

Number-one artists

See also
1966 in music
List of Billboard number-one singles
Cashbox Top 100 number-one singles of 1966

Sources
Fred Bronson's Billboard Book of Number 1 Hits, 5th Edition
Joel Whitburn's Top Pop Singles 1955-2008, 12 Edition
Joel Whitburn Presents the Billboard Hot 100 Charts: The Sixties
Additional information obtained can be verified within Billboard's online archive services and print editions of the magazine.

References

1966 record charts
1966